The U.S. National Yo-Yo Contest is the culminating yo-yo competition of the National Yo-Yo League (NYYL). The winner of this event in any of the five divisions is deemed the US National Yo-Yo Champion — the only event to award such a title in the United States. The winner of this competition gains the seed to the semi-final at the World Yo-Yo Contest as the United States representative. The contest has traditionally taken place in Chico, California, home to the National Yo-Yo Museum. Players qualify for the U.S. National Yo-Yo Contest through one of the nine NYYL sanctioned Regional competition. The National Yo-Yo League is the officially recognized organizing body for the United States competitive yo-yo circuit. In addition to the contest, they present US National Yo-Yo Museum awards and other honorary awards given to individuals who have contributed significantly to the yo-yo community. There are presently no plans for the 2018 competition.

History
The first National Yo-Yo Contest took place in 1993. The contest has been hosted by the Bird In Hand yo-yo store, and owner Bob Malowney, in Chico, California. For many years, the contest took place in the Chico City Park.

Current Champions

There are currently five U.S. National Champions. They each earn the right to represent the United States at the World Yo-Yo Contest, either in the semi-finals for 1A, or the finals for 2A-5A.

Only Zach Gormley, Yuuki Spencer and Gentry Stein have ever won the 1A division more than once. Alex Hattori holds the record for National Titles with 8 in as many years. Shane Karan remains the only player to ever win two divisions in the same year. California has produced the most Nation Champions over the years. In 2013, Ian Johnson completed a flawless routine in the 4A division.

Championship Divisions
The US National Yo-Yo Contest has 5 championship divisions that award the title of 'US National Yo-Yo Champion'

Championship Division Structure
There are a series of preliminary rounds before the final round at U.S. National Yo-Yo Contest. In the past, anyone could enter the U.S. National Yo-Yo Contest. Competitors were allowed a one-minute routine, and a set number of players would make the finals. Presently, to compete in the preliminaries, a player must qualify top 5 in a Regional Competition. 
There are currently two rounds of competition.

 Semi-Final (1 minute)
 Top-5 at a sanctioned Regional Competition seeded directly to Preliminary
 Final (3 minutes)
 9 Regional Champions 
 Top performing competitors from Semi-Final

Sanctioned Seeding Competitions
Players can earn a seed to various rounds of the preliminaries through one of the nine NYYL sanctioned Regional Competition.
Bay Area Classic (BAC)
Pacific Northwest Regional (PNWR)
Southwest Regional (SWR)
Midwest Regional (MWR)
Southeast Regional (SER)
Mideast Regional (MER)
Northeast Regional (NER)
Mid-Atlantic Regional (MAR)

Non-Championship Divisions

References

External links 
 World Yo-Yo Contest The World Yo-Yo Contest Web Site

Yo-yo competitions